Patric Nebhuth (born 19 March 1973) is a German judoka.

Achievements

References

External links

1973 births
Living people
German male judoka
Place of birth missing (living people)
20th-century German people